Coastal Spirit FC is an association football club in Christchurch, New Zealand. Their Premier Men's team currently competes in the Mainland Premier League. Their Premier Women's team competes in the Mainland Women's Premier League and were the 2013 National Knockout Cup winners. 

Coastal Spirit FC was established through the merger of New Brighton AFC and Rangers AFC in 2007, which was one of the oldest clubs in New Zealand having been founded in 1913.

References

 UltimateNZSoccer website's Coastal Spirit page

External links
 Coastal Spirit Official website

Association football clubs in Christchurch
Association football clubs established in 2007
2007 establishments in New Zealand